Psoralea glandulosa is a herb species in the genus Psoralea found in Perú and Chile in South America and also in the United States.

Psoralea glandulosa was described by Linné and published in Species Plantarum 2: 1075. 1763.

References

Bibliography 
 Bouton, L. (1857). Trans. Roy. Soc. Arts Mauritius n. s. 1: 1-177 Medicinal plants...
 List Based Record (1986). U.S. Soil Conservation Service.
 Marticorena, C., y M. Quezada (1985). Gayana, Bot. 42: 1-157 Catálogo de la flora vascular de Chile.

External links

Psoraleeae
Plants described in 1753
Taxa named by Carl Linnaeus